The Final Strife is a novel written by Sudanese-Arab-Ghanaian-British author Saara El-Arifi. It was published by Del Rey Books in the United States and HarperVoyager in the United Kingdom. The Final Strife is the first part of The Ending Fire trilogy with roots in Arabian and African mythology. The trilogy sold in two six-figure deals and was selected as one of Amazon's best books of 2022.

References 

2022 fantasy novels
Del Rey books